Harahorn, also written Harahødn, is a mountain located in the Hemsedal municipality in Norway. It is a part of Hemsedal Top 20.

Mountains of Viken